Weywot (formal designation (50000) Quaoar I; provisional designation S/2006 (50000) 1) is a natural satellite or moon of the trans-Neptunian dwarf planet 50000 Quaoar. It was discovered by Michael Brown and Terry-Ann Suer using images acquired by the Hubble Space Telescope on 14 February 2006. Named after the Tongva sky god and son of Quaoar, Weywot is thought to be a fragment of Quaoar that was ejected into an eccentric orbit around the dwarf planet by a major impact event billions of years ago. Weywot is thought to play a role in maintaining Quaoar's distant ring by gravitationally influencing it in an orbital resonance.

Discovery 
Weywot was first imaged by the Hubble Space Telescope on 14 February 2006, during Michael Brown's survey for satellites around large trans-Neptunian objects (TNOs) using Hubbles high-resolution Advanced Camera for Surveys. Consecutive images from that date showed that Weywot appeared stationary relative to Quaoar and was visibly separated by 0.35 arcseconds. After Brown's Hubble survey concluded in late 2006, he and his colleague Terry-Ann Suer reported their newly-discovered TNO satellites to the Central Bureau for Astronomical Telegrams, which published their discovery of Weywot alongside three other TNO satellites on 22 February 2007.

To determine Weywot's orbit, Brown reobserved Weywot with Hubble in March 2007 and March 2008. With his colleague Wesley Fraser, Brown published the first preliminary orbit of Weywot in May 2010. Fraser and Brown were unable to precover Weywot in earlier ultraviolet Hubble images of Quaoar from 2002, either because the satellite was obscured by Quaoar or it was too faint in ultraviolet light.

Name 
Upon discovery, Weywot was given a provisional designation, . Brown left the choice of a name up to the Tongva, whose creator-god Quaoar had been named after. The Tongva chose the sky god Weywot, son of Quaoar. The name of Weywot was officially announced by the Minor Planet Center in a notice published on 4 October 2009.

Orbit 

Its orbit is inclined by about 16° with respect to the ecliptic plane, indicating that the Quaoar system rotates prograde with respect to the ecliptic.

Weywot has a high orbital eccentricity of 0.14, which contradicts theoretical expectations that Weywot could have formed out of a disk of material in circular orbit around Quaoar. Instead of having a synchronous rotation tidally locked to Quaoar, Weywot's high eccentricity may subject it to a spin-orbit resonance similar to the planet Mercury, where its rotation period is an integer ratio of its orbital period. Several possible explanations for Weywot's high eccentricity include collisions with other bodies, an origin as a collisionally-ejected fragment of Quaoar, gravitational perturbations, or resonances by other massive bodies. Of these scenarios, Weywot most likely formed as a fragment of Quaoar that was ejected into an initially eccentric orbit by a major impact event billions of years ago. Weywot's orbit must have tidally evolved very slowly for it to remain eccentric today, which would mean its orbit has changed very little since it had formed. The trans-Neptunian dwarf planet 225088 Gonggong hosts a similarly eccentric satellite named Xiangliu, and it is inferred to have formed and evolved in the same way as Weywot.

In 2013 and prior, orbit determinations for Weywot were complicated by the issue of mirror ambiguity, where two possible inclinations could equally fit Weywot's orbit due to the lack of parallactic change in its projected orbital plane. That is, it could not be recognized whether Weywot orbited prograde or retrograde with respect to the ecliptic. The discontinuity of known observations of Weywot at the time also resulted in a 0.39-day alias in its orbital period, which allowed for even more possible orbit solutions with different orbital periods. These issues were eventually resolved when astronomers obtained a precise measurement of Weywot's position from a stellar occultation on 4 August 2019, which allowed researchers to unambiguously settle on a prograde 12.4-day orbit for Weywot.

Ring dynamics 
This near-coincidence suggests Weywot could play a role in perturbing the rings and producing irregularities in the ring's width and density. Together with Quaoar's 1:3 spin-orbit resonance that lies slightly farther from the ring, the 6:1 Weywot mean-motion resonance is thought to help prevent the ring from accreting into a solid body. It is unknown which of these two resonances play a more dominant role in maintaining the ring, as the underlying parameters necessary to calculate their effects are poorly known.

Physical characteristics 
Weywot is extremely dim, with an apparent magnitude of 24.7—that is,  magnitudes fainter than Quaoar in visible light. Combined with its close proximity to Quaoar, Weywot's faintness makes observations difficult, leaving it resolvable only to the most sensitive telescopes such as Hubble and the Keck Telescopes. For these reasons, most of Weywot's physical properties such as its mass, color, and light curve have yet to be measured.

Given Weywot's magnitude difference from Quaoar, this occultation-derived diameter suggests Weywot has a geometric albedo of about 0.03, which is considerably darker than Quaoar's albedo of 0.1.

Notes

References 

50000 Quaoar
Trans-Neptunian satellites
Discoveries by Michael E. Brown
20060214
Objects observed by stellar occultation